"" ("The Rallying Song"), also known as "" ("O Cameroon, Cradle of our Forefathers") is the national anthem of Cameroon and former national anthem of French Cameroon.

History
It was used on an unofficial basis in  French Cameroon beginning in 1948 before independence and officially adopted as the anthem of the territory in 1957. In 1960, the anthem was officially adopted by the new Republic of Cameroon.

In 1961, upon the accession of the former British Southern Cameroons to the Republic of Cameroon, an English version was written by Bernard Nsokika Fonlon, which was later officially adopted in 1978.

Lyrics

Current lyrics (1970–present)

In local languages 
The anthem has also been translated into several local languages.

Former lyrics (1957–1970)

Notes

References

External links
 Cameroon: O Cameroon, Cradle of Our Forefathers - Audio of the national anthem of Cameroon, with information and lyrics (archive link)
 'Chant de Ralliement'/'The Rallying Song' MIDI

National anthems
Cameroonian culture
African anthems
National anthem compositions in B-flat major
1928 songs